Jerome L Delvin II (born September 15, 1956) is an American politician of the Republican Party. He was a member of the Washington State Senate, representing District 8 from his appointment in 2004, serving the 8th district until February 4, 2013 when he left to become Benton County Commissioner in January 2013.

References

External links 
 [https://www.ourcampaigns.com/CandidateDetail.html?CandidateID=21608 
Jerome Delvin at ourcampaigns.com]

1956 births
Living people
County commissioners in Washington (state)
Members of the Washington House of Representatives
Washington (state) state senators
People from Richland, Washington